The U.S. State of Colorado is divided into 64 counties. Two of these counties, the City and County of Broomfield and the City and County of Denver, have consolidated city and county governments. Denver serves as the state capital. Counties are important units of government in Colorado since there are no civil townships or other minor civil divisions.

El Paso County with a 2020 population of 730,395 is the most populous Colorado county, while San Juan County with a 2020 population of 705 is the least populous. The City and County of Denver with a 2020 population density of 4,674 residents per square mile (1,805 km−2) is the most densely populated Colorado county, while Hinsdale County with a 2020 population density of 0.71 resident per square mile (0.27 km−2) is the least densely populated.

Mount Elbert, the highest summit of Colorado and the entire Rocky Mountains at  elevation, is located in Lake County. The point where the Arikaree River flows out of Yuma County and into Kansas is the lowest point in Colorado at  elevation. This point, which is the highest low point of any state, is higher than the high points of 18 states and the District of Columbia.


History
On November 1, 1861, the new Territory of Colorado created 17 original counties: Arapahoe, Boulder, Clear Creek, Costilla, Douglas, El Paso, Fremont, Gilpin, Guadalupe, Huerfano, Jefferson, Lake, Larimer, Park, Pueblo, Summit, and Weld; plus the Cheyenne Reserve.

On February 9, 1866, the first new county, Las Animas, was created, followed by Saguache in December of that year. Bent County was created in February 1870, followed by Greenwood the following month. On February 2, 1874, Grand County and Elbert County were formed, and on February 10, La Plata, Hinsdale, and Rio Grande counties were created. Greenwood was absorbed into Bent on February 5. The last county to be created under the Colorado Territory name was San Juan County, created three months before statehood.

By the time Colorado became a state on August 1, 1876, it had only 26 counties. In January 1877, Routt and Ouray were formed, followed by Gunnison and Custer counties in March. In February 1879, Chaffee County was created. From February 8–10, 1879, Lake county was renamed Carbonate County. In 1881, Dolores County and Pitkin County were created. In 1883, Montrose, Mesa, Garfield, Eagle, Delta, and San Miguel counties were formed, leaving the total number of counties at 39. The number rose to 40 in 1885 with the creation of Archuleta County on April 14. Washington County and Logan County were both created in 1887. Between February 19 and April 16 in 1889, Morgan, Yuma, Cheyenne, Otero, Rio Blanco, Phillips, Sedgwick, Kiowa, Kit Carson, Lincoln, Prowers, Baca, and Montezuma counties were formed, bringing the total to 55. By 1900, Mineral County and Teller County had been added. On November 15, 1902, Arapahoe County was split into Adams and South Arapahoe Counties, and Denver was consolidated as a city and county from portions of both newly formed counties on December 1, 1902. By 1912, Jackson County, Moffat County, and Crowley County had been created. Alamosa was created in 1913, and in 2001, Broomfield was consolidated as a city and county, bringing the total to 64 counties.

The 64 counties of the State of Colorado

|}

Population estimates

United States Census Bureau population estimates for July 1, 2021 are in included in the Population history of Colorado counties.

With a 2021 population of 737,867, El Paso County remains the most populous county, while San Juan County with a 2021 population of 733 remains the least populous. Five of the 64 Colorado counties now have more than 500,000 residents, while 12 have fewer than 5,000 residents.

Former counties

The following sortable table lists all the historic counties of the Territory of New Mexico, the Territory of Utah, the Territory of Kansas, and the extralegal Territory of Jefferson that previously existed within the boundaries of the present State of Colorado, as well as the three defunct counties of the Territory of Colorado and the three defunct counties of the State of Colorado.

County high points

Of the 64 Colorado counties, 20 counties extend above  elevation, 32 counties extend above , 42 counties extend above , and all 64 Colorado counties extend above .

County mean elevation

Of Colorado's 64 counties, 4 counties have a mean elevation above  elevation, 22 counties have a mean elevation above , 32 counties have a mean elevation above , and all 64 counties have a mean elevation above .

The following 13 Colorado counties have highest mean elevation of any county in the United States, exceeding even the Denali Borough of Alaska.

County firsts
1. Costilla County was the first area within the present State of Colorado to be settled by Europeans in 1851.
2. Taos County, created by the Territory of New Mexico in 1852, was the first organized county to extend into the area of the present State of Colorado.
3. Arapahoe County, created by the Territory of Kansas in 1855, was the first county created exclusively within the area of the present State of Colorado.
4. On November 28, 1859, the extralegal Territory of Jefferson created 12 counties:

5. On November 1, 1861, the Territory of Colorado created the 17 original Colorado counties:

6. Of the 17 original Colorado counties created in 1861, only Gilpin County and Clear Creek County have retained their original boundaries with only minor survey changes.
7. Guadaloupe County was the first Colorado county to be renamed after only six days in 1861.
8. Las Animas County was the first new Colorado county to be created (in 1866) after the original 17 counties.
9. Greenwood County was the longest lived former Colorado county, existing four years from 1870 to 1874.
10. In 1876, San Juan County became the last county created by the Territory of Colorado, bringing the total number of territorial counties to 26.
11. In 1877, Ouray County became the first county created by the new State of Colorado.
12. Carbonate County was the shortest lived former Colorado county, existing only two days in 1879 before being dissolved.
13. The City and County of Broomfield became the newest Colorado county in 2001, bring the total number of counties to 64.

County distinctions
1. El Paso County (91) and the City and County of Denver (94) and are among the 100 most populous counties of the United States.
2. San Juan County (16), Hinsdale County (25), Mineral County (32), Jackson County (55), Kiowa County (59), and Cheyenne County (80) are among the 100 least populous counties of the United States.
3. Jefferson County borders ten adjacent counties, the most of any Colorado county.
4. Delta County and the City and County of Denver each border only three adjacent counties, the fewest of Colorado counties.
5. Weld County has the most incorporated municipalities of any Colorado county with 31.
6. The following nine Colorado counties have no incorporated municipalities other than their county seat:

7. Of all 64 Colorado counties, only Conejos County has a county seat that is not an incorporated municipality.
8. The City and County of Denver and the City and County of Broomfield are the only two Colorado counties with enclaves. Arapahoe County, Boulder County, and Jefferson County are the only three Colorado counties with exclaves.

Gallery

See also

List of populated places in Colorado
List of census-designated places in Colorado
Population history of Colorado census-designated places
List of counties in Colorado
List of county seats in Colorado
Population history of Colorado counties
List of forts in Colorado
List of ghost towns in Colorado
List of historic places in Colorado
List of municipalities in Colorado
Population history of Colorado municipalities
List of populated places in Colorado by county
List of post offices in Colorado
List of statistical areas in Colorado

Notes

References

External links

United States Department of Commerce
United States Census Bureau
State of Colorado
Department of Local Affairs
Colorado County Clerks Association
History Colorado

 
Colorado history-related lists
Lists of populated places in Colorado
Local government in Colorado
Colorado, List of counties in